Manuel L. Quezon Avenue, more often called as Quezon Avenue, or simply Quezon Ave (pronounced: Ke-zon-Av), is a  major thoroughfare in Metro Manila named after President Manuel Luis Quezon, the second president of the Philippines. The avenue starts at the Quezon Memorial Circle and runs through to the Mabuhay Rotonda near the boundary of Quezon City and Manila.

Lined with palm trees on its center island and spanning six to fourteen lanes, it is a major north-south and east-west corridor of Quezon City. Many government and commercial buildings line the road. At its north end, the Triangle Park, one of Quezon City's Central Business District, is the third most important industrial center in the city. At its south end, it connects Quezon City to the Philippine's capital – Manila connecting with Eulogio Rodriguez Sr. Avenue. It is a regular route for vehicles from Quezon City leading to Manila, as the highway provide access to Quiapo and the University Belt.

History
The avenue was developed as part of a road plan to connect the government center of Manila in Rizal Park to the proposed new capital on the Diliman Estate. It was also referred to as Quezon Boulevard Extension, Calle España, and Malawen Boulevard. 

The road, much like Commonwealth Avenue, was then named Don Mariano Marcos Avenue to honor Mariano Marcos, the father of President Ferdinand Marcos. The road was renamed Quezon Avenue after former president Manuel Quezon following the 1986 People Power Revolution with the ascension of Corazon Aquino as president. It originally starts at EDSA, but the portion between the Elliptical Road and EDSA, which used to be named Commonwealth Avenue extension, became a part of the road. With the passing of the 1987 Constitution, Quezon City had four legislative districts until 2013 when it added two new districts. The west of the Quezon Avenue were constituted into the first district and the fourth district situated east of the road.

U-turn slots
In 2003, after the perceived effectiveness in EDSA, Commonwealth Avenue and Marcos Highway, the Metropolitan Manila Development Authority (MMDA) implemented the "clearway scheme"; this has prohibited crossings and left turns on the avenue.

Quezon Avenue–Araneta Avenue underpass

In June 2011, a  four-lane underpass was started along the Gregorio Araneta Avenue Intersection. The construction was slated to take up to 15 months. In September 2012, President Benigno Aquino III opened the underpass to the public. The project cost  or below the  budget allocated for it.

Motorcycle lanes
In 2012, the MMDA instituted motorcycle lanes in the avenue. The lanes are painted blue and are meant exclusively for the use of motorcycle riders. This comes after the successful use of the "blue lanes" on EDSA, Commonwealth Avenue, and Macapagal Boulevard, although the blue lane on EDSA is not exclusive to motorcycles.

Intersections

Landmarks
Starting from its western terminus:
Mabuhay Rotonda
Santo Domingo Church
Fisher Mall
Delta Theatre (Dela Merced Building, soon-to-be-converted by DMCI into a mixed-use residential project)
Crossings Department Store and Supermarket
Capitol Medical Center
The Skysuites Tower
DILG-NAPOLCOM Center
Eton Centris
Bantayog ng mga Bayani Center
Balik Probinsya, Bagong Pag-asa Depot
National Grid Corporation of the Philippines
Philippine Children's Medical Center
Lung Center of the Philippines
Ninoy Aquino Parks & Wildlife Center
Quezon Memorial Circle

See also
Commonwealth Avenue, eastern extension of Quezon Avenue starting from the Quezon Memorial Circle
España Boulevard, western extension of Quezon Avenue starting from Mabuhay Rotonda.
Major roads in Metro Manila

References

Streets in Quezon City